Massaga monteirona is a moth of the family Noctuidae. It is found in Angola, Cameroon, the Democratic Republic of Congo and Ivory Coast.

References

Moths described in 1874
Agaristinae
Insects of the Democratic Republic of the Congo
Insects of West Africa
Insects of Angola
Moths of Africa